Kim Jip (1574–1656) was a Korean Joseon Neo-Confucian scholar, politician, educator and writer.  He was also the teacher of Song Si-yeol and Song Jun-gil, great Korean Neo-Confucian scholars.

Family 
 Great-Great-Grandfather
 Kim Jung-yun (김종윤, 金宗胤)
 Great-Grandfather
 Kim Ho (김호, 金鎬)
 Great-Grandmother 
 Lady Lee of the Jeonui Lee clan (전의 이씨); daughter of Lee Gwang-won (이광원, 李光元)
 Grandfather 
 Kim Gye-hwi (김계휘, 金繼輝) (1526 - 1582)
 Grandmother
 Lady Shin of the Pyeongsan Shin clan (평산 신씨)
 Father
 Kim Jang-saeng (김장생, 金長生) (8 July 1548 - 3 August 1631)
 Half-aunt - Lady Kim of the Gwangsan Kim clan (광산 김씨, 光山 金氏); Kim Sang-yong’s second wife
 Uncle - Kim Sang-yong (김상용, 金尙容) (1561 - 22 January 1637)
 Half-cousin - Internal Princess Consort Yeongga of the Andong Kim clan (영가부부인 김씨, 永嘉府夫人 金氏) (? - 19 January 1654)
 Half first cousin - Queen Inseon of the Deoksu Jang clan (인선왕후 장씨) (9 February 1619 - 19 March 1674)
 Mother
 Lady Jo of the Changnyeong Jo clan (창녕 조씨); Kim Jang-saeng’s first wife
 Grandfather - Jo Dae-geon (조대건, 曺大乾)
 Stepmother - Lady Kim of the Suncheon Kim clan (순천 김씨); a descendant of Kim Jong-seo
 Unnamed stepmother
 Siblings
 Older brother - Kim Eun (김은, 金檃) (1569 - 1592?); went missing during the Imjin War
 Sister-in-law - Lady Seo of the Buyeo Seo clan (부여 서씨)
 Younger brother - Kim Ban (김반, 金槃) (1580 - 1640)
 Sister-in-law - Lady Seo of the Yeonsan Seo clan (연산 서씨)
 Nephew - Kim Ik-ryeol (김익렬, 金益烈) (1601 - 1631)
 Adoptive grandnephew - Kim Man-jun (김만준, 金萬埈) (1634 - 1691); son of Kim Ik-hui
 Nephew - Kim Ik-hui (김익희, 金益熙) (1610 - 1656)
 Niece-in-law - Lady Yi of the Hansan Yi clan (한산 이씨)
 Grandnephew - Kim Man-gyun (김만균, 金萬均)
 Grandnephew - Kim Man-jeung (김만증, 金萬增)
 Grandnephew - Kim Man-bae (김만배, 金萬培)
 Nephew - Kim Ik-gyeom (김익겸(金益兼) (1614 - 22 January 1637)
 Niece-in-law - Lady Yun of the Haepyeong Yun clan (해평 윤씨) (25 September 1617 - 22 December 1689)
 Grandnephew - Kim Man-gi (김만기, 金萬基) (1633 - 15 March 1687)
 Great-Grandniece - Queen Ingyeong of the Gwangsan Kim clan (인경왕후 김씨) (25 October 1661 - 16 December 1680)
 Grandnephew - Kim Man-jung (김만중, 金萬重) (6 March 1637 - 14 June 1692)
 Sister-in-law - Lady Kim of the Buyeo Kim clan (부여 김씨, 扶餘 金氏)
 Nephew - Kim Ik-hun (김익훈, 金益勳) (9 November 1619 - 11 March 1689)
 Niece-in-law - Lady Kim of the Andong Kim clan (안동 김씨, [舊]安東 金氏) (? - 1676)
 Grandnephew - Kim Man-chae (김만채, 金萬埰)
 Grandnephew - Kim Man-ge (김만게, 金萬垍)
 Grandnephew - Kim Man-seon (김만선, 金萬墡)
 Nephew - Kim Ik-gyeong (김익경, 金益炅) (1629 - 1675)
 Grandnephew - Kim Man-jae (김만재,金萬裁)
 Grandnephew - Kim Man-gyeon (김만견, 金萬堅)
 Grandnephew - Kim Man-ji (김만지, 金萬至)
 Grandnephew - Kim Man-geun (김만근, 金萬謹)
 Grandniece - Lady Kim of the Gwangsan Kim clan (광산 김씨)
 Grandnephew-in-law - Sim Jeong-gyu (심정규, 沈廷揆); 8th great-grandnephew of Sim On and 8th great-grandson of Sim Jing
 Sister-in-law - Lady Yeo of the Hamyang Yeo clan (함양 여씨)
 Nephew - Kim Ik-hu (김익후, 金益煦) (1624 - 1648)
 Grandnephew - Kim Man-gil (김만길, 金萬吉) (1645 - 1673)
 4 unnamed siblings with unnamed stepmother
 Wives and their children
 Lady Yu of the Gigye Yu clan (기계 유씨); daughter of Yu Hong (유홍, 兪泓) — No issue.
 Lady Yi of the Deoksu Yi clan (덕수 이씨); daughter of Yi Yi 
 Son - Kim Ik-hyeong (김익형, 金益炯)
 Grandson - Kim Man-ri (김만리, 金萬里)
 Grandson - Kim Man-gyu (김만규, 金萬奎)
 Grandson - Kim Man-jil (김만질, 金萬窒)
 Grandson - Kim Man-ryang (김만량, 金萬量)
 Grandson - Kim Man-bong (김만봉, 金萬封)
 Grandson - Kim Man-dang (김만당, 金萬堂)
 Son - Kim Ik-ryeon (김익련, 金益煉)
 Grandson - Kim Man-seong (김만성, 金萬城)
 Grandson - Kim Man-je (김만제, 金萬堤)
 Grandson - Kim Man-ju (김만주, 金萬周)
 Grandson - Kim Man-yong (김만용, 金萬墉)

Works 
 Sindokjaejip (신독재집)
 Uiryemunhaesok (의례문해속, 疑禮問解續)

See also 
 Seong Hon
 Gim Jangsaeng
 Queen Ingyeong
 Gim Manjung
 Yi I
 Gim Ikhun
 Song Jungil
 Song Siyeol
 Yun Seongeo
 Yun Hyu
 Yun Jeung

Notes

References

 Kim Haboush, JaHyun and Martina Deuchler (1999). Culture and the State in Late Chosŏn Korea.  Cambridge: Harvard University Press. ;  OCLC 40926015
 Lee, Peter H. (1993). Sourcebook of Korean Civilization, Vol.  1. New York: Columbia University Press. ; ; ;  OCLC 26353271
 Noh, Daehwan. "The Eclectic Development of Neo-Confucianism and Statecraft from the 18th to the 19th Century," Korea Journal. Winter 2003.

1574 births
1656 deaths
Neo-Confucian scholars
Korean educators
17th-century Korean writers
Joseon scholar-officials
Korean scholars
Korean Confucianists
17th-century Korean philosophers